was an early-Edo period Japanese samurai, and the 3rd daimyō  of Kaga Domain in the Hokuriku region of Japan. He was the 4th hereditary chieftain of the Kanazawa Maeda clan. His courtesy titles were Chikuzen-no-kami and Sakonoe-shosho. His childhood name was "Inuchiyo" (犬千代).

Mitsutaka was the eldest son of Maeda Toshitsune and his mother was Tamahime, the daughter of Shōgun Tokugawa Hidetada.  His infant name was Inuchiyo and his childhood name was Toshitaka, In 1629, he underwent the genpuku ceremony presided over by his uncle, Tokugawa Iemitsu, and was allowed to adopt the Matsudaira patronym as an honorific and was given one kanji from Iemitsu's name, thus becoming "Mitsutaka". The Tokugawa clan and the Maeda clan attempted to maintain close relations though political intermarriage during this period, and Mitsutaka was married to Ōhime, the daughter of Tokugawa Yorinobu of Mito Domain.

In 1639, Toshitsune retired, dividing Kaga Domain between his three eldest sons. Mitsutaka's portion came to a kokudaka of 800,000 koku, which was the lowest in Kaga Domain's history, but still larger than any other domain within the Tokugawa shogunate. A well-known story is that Mitsutaka received word of the birth of his son, Tsunanori just as he was departing Kanazawa for the return journey to Edo for his sankin kōtai obligation and became so excited that the party rushed back to Edo in a record seven days from Kanazawa.

Mitsutaka was also accomplished in the martial arts, and was also known for his knowledge of both Japanese and Chinese literature. He was also regarded for his appearance, and became a  favorite of Tokugawa Iemitsu. For a time, before Iemitsu had conceived an heir, Mitsutaka was considered a potential candidate to be adopted by Iemitsu to inherit the office of shōgun.

In 1645, at a tea ceremony hosted by the rōjū, Sakai Tadakatsu, he suddenly fell over dead at the age of 29. His grave is at the Nodayama Cemetery in Kanazawa.

Family
Father: Maeda Toshitsune
Mother: Tokugawa Tamahime (1599 – 1622), daughter of Tokugawa Hidetada and Asai Oeyo
Wife: Tokugawa Ōhime (1627-1665), daughter of Tokugawa Yorinobu of Wakayama Domain
Children (all by Ohime)
 Maeda Tsunanori
 Mankikumaru (1645-1649)

References 
Papinot, Edmond. (1948). Historical and Geographical Dictionary of Japan. New York: Overbeck Co.

External links
Kaga Domain on "Edo 300 HTML" (3 November 2007) 

1616 births
1645 deaths
Maeda clan
Tozama daimyo
People of Edo-period Japan